3333 may refer to:
3333 Schaber, an asteroid discovered in 1980
3333, a year in the 4th millennium
3333 BC, a year in the 34th century BC
Riverside Park Community, an apartment complex in New York City located at 3333 Broadway
Evergrande Group stock ticker